Universidad Autónoma España de Durango (Spanish Autonomous University of Durango) is a university in Durango, Durango, Mexico, founded in 1994. Branded as Universidad España (or UNES), the university has four additional branch campuses across three northern Mexican states.

Campuses
UNES has five campuses:

Universidad Autónoma España de Durango, Durango, Durango
Universidad Autónoma España de Durango, Campus Guadalupe Victoria, Guadalupe Victoria, Durango
Universidad Autónoma España de Durango, Campus Vicente Guerrero, Vicente Guerrero, Durango
Universidad Autónoma España de Durango, Campus Parral, Hidalgo del Parral, Chihuahua
Instituto Universidad España de Coahuila, Saltillo, Coahuila

Media
UNES operates an FM radio and a television station, both in Durango. XHUNES-FM transmits on 92.9 FM and signed on in 2005, while XHUNES-TV channel 28, branded as España TV 28, was the first university television station in the state, signing on in 2008.

External links

Universities and colleges in Durango
Universities and colleges in Coahuila
Universities and colleges in Chihuahua (state)
Durango City